Syrian Desert campaign may refer to:
 Syrian Desert campaign (December 2017–present)
 Syrian Desert campaign (May–July 2017)
 Syrian Desert campaign (December 2016–April 2017)